Fort Emmanuel, also known as Fort Manuel, is a ruined fort located at Fort Kochi Beach in Kochi (Cochin), Kerala, India. It is a bastion of the Portuguese and a symbol of the strategic alliance between the Maharaja of Kochi and the Kingdom of Portugal. Named after Manuel I of Portugal, it was the first European Portuguese fort in Asia.

History 
In September 1503 the chief of Kochi granted permission to Afonso de Albuquerque to build Fort Emmanuel near the waterfront of the Arabian Sea. The construction was commenced on 26 September, and "it took the shape of a square with flanking bastions at the corners mounted with ordnance". The walls were made of double rows of coconut tree stems securely fastened together and with earth rammed firmly between; it was further protected by a wet ditch. The fort was christened on the morning of 1 October 1503 "Emmanuel", after the King of Portugal.

The fort was built at the water-bound region towards the south-west of the Kochi mainland. The fortifications were reinforced in 1538. The Portuguese built their settlement behind the fort, including the St Francis Church. Fort Kochi remained in Portuguese possession until 1663, when the Dutch captured the territory and destroyed the Portuguese institutions. The Dutch held the fort in their possession until 1795, when the British took control by defeating the Dutch. By 1806 the Dutch, and later the British, had destroyed most of the fort walls and its bastions.

In Old Kochi and alongside the Fort Kochi beach, there is a partially restored gun battery and other remains of ramparts and fortifications, which are now tourist destinations.

See also
List of topics on the Portuguese Empire in the East

Gallery

References

External links 

Forts in Kerala
Buildings and structures in Kochi
Colonial Kerala
Portuguese forts in India
Portuguese in Kerala
History of Kochi
Kingdom of Cochin
Archaeological sites in Kerala
Infrastructure completed in 1503
1503 establishments in India
1500s establishments in Portuguese India
Tourist attractions in Kochi